Christine Brückner (10 December 1921, in Schmillinghausen, Bad Arolsen, Free State of Waldeck-Pyrmont – 21 December 1996, in Kassel) was a German writer. Her first novel, Before the Traces Disappear (Ehe die Spuren verwehen), was published in 1954.

Life
Christine Brückner, the daughter of pastor Carl Emde and his wife Clodtilde, was born in Schmillinghausen near Arolsen in the Free State of Waldeck-Pyrmont where she lived until 1934 when she moved to Kassel. She attended high school in Arolsen and Kassel, completing her Abitur (high-school graduation) in 1941. 

During World War II, she was drafted for service in the General Command in Kassel and then worked as a bookkeeper in an aircraft factory in Halle. After the war, she received a diploma as librarian in Stuttgart. She studied economics, literature, art history, and psychology in Marburg, where for two semesters she was director of the Mensa Academica. During that time, she wrote articles for the magazine Frauenwelt (Women's World) in Nuremberg. 

From 1948 to 1958, she was married to the industrial designer Werner Brückner (1920–1977). In 1960, she returned to Kassel, where, from 1967, she lived with her second husband and fellow writer Otto Heinrich Kühner (1921–1996), with whom she collaborated on several works.

From 1980 to 1984, she was Vice-President of the German PEN Center. She is an honorary citizen of the city of Kassel. Brückner died in 1996, ten weeks after her husband. The couple is buried in Schmillinghausen.

In 1984, they established the Brückner-Kühner Foundation. Since 1985, it has awarded the Kassel Literary Prize for "grotesque and comic work" at a high artistic level. The Foundation, now located in the house in which Christine Brückner and her husband lived, serves as a center for comic literature. It is now a small museum.

Major works
Christine Brückner's work focused on the fundamental conflicts between humans, particularly from a woman's perspective, while reflecting the author's Protestant worldview.

Brückner's first novel, Before the Traces Disappear (Ehe die Spuren verwehen, Gütersloh, 1954), allowed her to make a living as a freelance writer. The manuscript won a competition run by the publisher Bertelsmann. In its first year it sold 376 thousand copies, and has since been translated into several languages. It tells the story of a man who is involved in the accidental death of a young woman, and his existential crisis which follows.

She then published a number of other novels, which focus mainly on the topics of love, marriage and relationships from a woman's perspective, and on the possibilities for female self-realization. In 1975, she appeared in Manure and Stock (Ffm / Bln.), followed by its sequels, Nowhere is Poenichen (Ffm / Bln. 1977) and The Quints (Ffm / Bln. 1985), which formed the so-called Poenichen trilogy. Almost 1000 pages long, it tells the life story of Maximiliane Quint, born in 1918, the granddaughter of an aristocratic landowner in Pomerania.
In 1977 and 1978 Manure and Stock and Nowhere is Poenichen were filmed as a mini-series for television, featuring actors Ulrike Bliefert, Arno Assmann and Edda Seippel in leading roles.

The monologues Desdemona – if you had only spoken – Eleven uncensored speeches of eleven incensed women (in German, Hamburg, 1983, translated by Eleanor Bron, Virago Press, London, 1992) not only achieved widespread success and was translated into many languages, but also established Brückner as a playwright, as they were among the most performed plays at the time. In tones from serious to cheerful, the work deals with historical and fictional female figures of Western cultural history, ranging from Clytemnestra to Christiane von Goethe to Gudrun Ensslin.

In addition to novels and stories, Brückner also published autobiographical works, plays and children's books. Ullstein has published a 20-volume collection of the author's works.

Awards and honors
1954 Bertelsmann Prize contest for Before the Traces Disappear
1982 Goethe-Plakette des Landes Hessen
1987 Honorary Citizen of the city of Kassel
1990 Hessian Order of Merit
1991 Federal Cross of Merit 1st Class
1996 Grand Federal Cross of Merit

Works

Works in English
Flight of cranes, Fromm International Pub. Corp., 1982, 
Gillyflower kid: a novel, Fromm International Pub. Corp., 1982, 
The time of the Leonids, Charles River Books, 1981,

Stories and novels
Ehe die Spuren verwehen, 1954 (Before the traces disappear)
Katharina und der Zaungast, 1957 (Catherine and the onlooker)
Ein Frühling im Tessin, 1960 (A Spring in Ticino)
Die Zeit danach, 1961 (The aftermath)
Bella Vista und andere Erzählungen, 1963 (Bella Vista and Other Stories)
Letztes Jahr auf Ischia, (Last year at Ischia) Ullstein Verlag, Frankfurt/Berlin/Wien 1964 
Der Kokon, 1966 (The cocoon)
Das glückliche Buch der a.p., 1970 (The Happy Book of a.p.)
Überlebensgeschichten, 1973 (Survival Stories)
Jauche und Levkojen, 1975 (Manure and stock)
Die Mädchen aus meiner Klasse, 1975 (The girls in my class)
Nirgendwo ist Poenichen, 1977 (Nowhere is Poenichen)
Was ist schon ein Jahr. Frühe Erzählungen, 1984 (What's a year. Early Stories)
Das eine sein, das andere lieben, 1981  (Be the one, the other love)
Die Quints, Ullstein, 1985,  (The Quints)
Die letzte Strophe, 1989  (The last stanza)
Früher oder später, 1994 (Sooner or later)

Dramatic monologues
Wenn du geredet hättest, Desdemona – Ungehaltene Reden ungehaltener Frauen (If you had Spoken, Desdemona – Indignant Speeches, Indignant Women) Hoffman and Campe, Hamburg 1983

Child and youth books
Alexander der Kleine. Eine heitere Erzählung, (Alexander the Little One. An amusing story) 1966
A brother for Momoko. London: The Bodley Head 1970 (dt.: Ein Bruder für Momoko, 1981)
Wie Sommer und Winter, (As Summer and Winter) 1971
Momoko und Chibi, (Momoko and Chibi) 1974
Die Weltreise der Ameise, (The world tour of the ant) 1974
Momoko ist krank, (Momoko is sick) 1979
Mal mir ein Haus with Otto Heinrich Kühner, (Time for me a home) 1980
Momoko und der Vogel, (Momoko and Bird) 1982

Publishing activities
Botschaften der Liebe in deutschen Gedichten des 20. Jahrhunderts, (Messages of love in German poems of the 20th Century) 1960.
An mein Kind. Deutsche Gedichte des 20. Jahrhunderts, (To my child. German poems of the 20th Century)  1962
Juist. Ein Lesebuch, (Juist. A reader) 1984
Lesezeit. Eine persönliche Anthologie, (Reading time. A personal anthology) 1986

Literature
Gunther Tietz (ed.): Über Christine Brückner. Aufsätze, Rezensionen, Interviews. Second edition. Frankfurt: Ullstein, 1990 (= Ullstein-Buch; 22173), 
Margaritha Jacobaeus: „Zum Lesen empfohlen“. Lesarten zu Christine Brückners Poenichen-Trilogie. Eine rezeptionsästhetische Studie. Stockholm: Almqvist and Wiksell International, 1995 (= Stockholmer germanistische Forschungen; 51), 
Karin Müller: „Das Leben hält sich oft eng an die Literatur“. Die Archetypen in den Poenichen-Romanen Christine Brückners. Glienicke/Berlin etc.: Galda und Wilch, 2000, 
Elwira Pachura: Polen – die verlorene Heimat. Zur Heimatproblematik bei Horst Bienek, Leonie Ossowski, Christa Wolf, Christine Brückner. Stuttgart: ibidem-Verlag, 2002, 
Pawel Zimniak: Die verlorene Zeit im verlorenen Reich. Christine Brückners Familiensaga und Leonie Ossowskis Familienchronik. Zielona Góra: Wydaw. Wyzszej szkoły pedagog., 1996, 
Friedrich W. Block (ed.): Christine Brückner und Otto Heinrich Kühner. „Der einzige funktionierende Autorenverband“. Kassel: euregioverlag, 2007,

References

External links
Biografie Christine Brückner
Stiftung Brückner-Kühner | Christine Brückner, Otto Heinrich Kühner und Dichterhaus

1921 births
1996 deaths
People from Bad Arolsen
People from the Free State of Waldeck-Pyrmont
Writers from Hesse
German women novelists
20th-century German women writers
20th-century German novelists
Commanders Crosses of the Order of Merit of the Federal Republic of Germany